Sher Dil may refer to:
 Sher Dil (Indian film), a 1990 Indian Hindi-language film
 Sher Dil (Pakistani film), a 1990 Pakistani action film